The following is a list of governors of Gaza. During Mamluk and early Ottoman rule, Gaza served as the capital of a province which at times included most of central and southern Palestine or the coastal plain up to Jaffa.

Ayyubids

Nasir al-Din (1244–1245)

Mamluks

Shams el-Din al-Barli (1259-1264)
Baybars al-Ala'i (1307–1309)
Baktamur (1310–1311)
Sanjar al-Jawli (1311–1320) 
Muhammad ibn Baktamur (1320–1329)
Turuntay al-Jukandari (1329–1332)
Taynal al-Ashrafi (1332–1335)
Sanjar al-Jawli (1342)
Ahmad al-Hajji (1373-1375)
Muhammad al-Adili (1375)
Akbugha al-Safawi (1375–1381)
Husam ad-Din Bakish (1382)
Aqbugha al-Tulutumari (?-1398)
Sayf ad-Din Inal al-Ala'i (1428–1433)
Timraz al-Mu'ayyadi (ca 1436-1437)
Yalkhuja an-Nasiri (1445–1446)
Sibay az-Zahiri (ca. 1482)
Aqbay al-Ashrafi (1482–1494)
Qani Bak (1494–1495)
Aqbay al-Ashrafi (1495–1496)
Dawlat Bay (1501–1517)

Ottoman

Sharaf ad-Din Musa al-Muzaffari (1517–1524)
Kara Şahin Mustafa (1524–1550) 
Ridwan Pasha (1550–1565)
Sinan Bey (1565–1567)
Ridwan Pasha (1567–1572)
Ahmad ibn Ridwan (1572–1601)
Hasan Arab Ridwan (1601–1660)
Husayn Pasha (1660–1663)
Musa Pasha (1663–1679)
Ahmad ibn Musa Pasha (1679-1690)
Sayed Ahmad (1708–1723)
Salih Pasha Touqan (1723–?)
Uthman Pasha (1760–1773)
Zahir al-Umar (1773–1774)
Suleiman Pasha (1804–1805) 
Muhammad Abu Marraq (1805–1807)
Muhammad Abu-Nabbut (1807–1818)
Mustafa Bey (1818–1820)
Abdullah Pasha (1820–1831)
Mas'ud al-Madi (1831–1834)
Mahmud Abd al-Hadi (1849)
Ahmad Rifaat Bak ash-Sharkasi (ca. 1868)

See also
History of Gaza

References

Bibliography

 

  

Rulers
Gaza Rulers
Gaza
 
Gaza Rulers